Wang Qi is the name of:

Wang Qi (footballer, born October 1993), Chinese midfielder
Wang Qi (footballer, born November 1993), Chinese goalkeeper
Wang Qi (physician) (born 1943), Chinese andrologist

See also
Qiwang (disambiguation)